William Ian Liddell (born 1938) CBE FREng FIStructE Hon FRIBA is a structural engineer and the designer of London's Millennium Dome. He was one of the founding partners of Buro Happold and is a Royal Academy Visiting Professor of Engineering Design at Cambridge University School of Engineering. He is now a consultant for Buro Happold.

He studied mechanical sciences at St John's College, Cambridge followed by a diploma in concrete structures at Imperial College, London.

He was project engineer on the Sydney Opera House, playing a significant role in the formfinding of the iconic roofs. He received the IStructE Gold Medal in 1999.

For his work as Chief Design Engineer on London's Millennium Dome project, he was appointed Commander of the Most Excellent Order of the British Empire (CBE) in the 1999 New Year Honours.

He is a trustee of the Arkwright Scholarships Trust and the Smallpeice Trust.

References 

1938 births
Living people
Alumni of Imperial College London
Alumni of St John's College, Cambridge
IStructE Gold Medal winners
British structural engineers
Fellows of the Royal Academy of Engineering
Commanders of the Order of the British Empire
Fellows of the Royal Institute of British Architects